Carbon Based Lifeforms is a Swedish electronic music duo formed in Gothenburg in 1996 by Johannes Hedberg and Daniel Vadestrid (né Ringström).

History

Formation and early period
Hedberg and Ringström (both born in 1976) first met in 1991, and started collaborating on the music tracker sequencer software Protracker and later, the Amiga computer system. In 1994, they started to work on PCs and formed a music tracker trio with fellow Swedish musician and producer Mikael Lindqvist called Bassment Studios. In the following year, they moved once more to MIDI-oriented music and formed Notch, focusing on acid, techno, and house music. Their first track was a remix of "What Would You Think" by synthpop group Mourning After. Lindqvist soon parted ways and Notch discontinued, but encouraged Hedberg and Ringström to continue recording their own music.

The pair had started to fully explore ambient music after Hedberg's sister had picked up Orgship (1994) by Solar Quest, which quickly became a favourite of theirs and influenced the two to make similar music. The electronic bands The Future Sound of London and Boards of Canada were also a big influence on them; Segerstad called them "our role models". After initial tracks were put together still under their Notch moniker, the duo wished to explore the genre further by incorporating drone and chill out elements. This led to the formation of their own identity, Carbon Based Lifeforms, in 1996, initially as a side project from Notch. They named themselves after Notch's second demo album, and thought it fits "with our underlying themes of the combination of biology and technology, also it alludes to a lot of sci-fi concepts." The band had built an initial following as Notch, and a bigger one later as Carbon Based Lifeforms, on MP3.com and Last.fm, which earned the group money following radio airplay exposure. When Last.fm switched from Winamp to another media player, the band saw a boost in traffic which also increased their income. Much of their music from their early period relied on delay and filter effects, and simpler sounds than their later tracks.

Signing with Ultimae and studio albums
In 2002, the band signed a record deal with French label Ultimae Records after the label discovered them on MP3.com. Vadestrid later said that the deal boosted their profile as a result, and the band started to perform at trance festivals during a time where it was uncommon for ambient acts to be on the big stage. Hedberg called the group's early years as "rough", partly due to Hedberg's fear of flying, which he did not conquer until 2009, leaving Vadestrid to perform live by himself. Their group's first gigs were in 2004. Their debut studio album, Hydroponic Garden, was released in 2003. It was followed by World of Sleepers in 2006. The pair recalled that the release of Interloper in 2010 marked a turning point where they "grew big", and look back on the album as their defining moment. Their follow-up, Twentythree, released in 2011, was originally finished in 2009 without beats, but the group became doubtful and self-critical about it. After discussing it with Ultimae, they produced a version with beats and put it out after Interloper.

After about ten years with Ultimae, the band departed from the label to focus on digital releases and to achieve greater control over their music. They formed their own label, Leftfield Records, to handle the digital releases. In 2014, the band were approached by Blood Music which led to a record deal to release their albums on CD and for the first time, on vinyl, with updated artwork, leaving the band to handle the digital releases themselves. They had not released their albums on vinyl before because Ultimae were "too busy to bother" about the format, and that there was not a big enough demand. In 2015, the band remastered their first three studio albums with the aim of getting "a more coherent sound between them", and for bringing out more details in the music. Also that year, the band revealed that Spotify is their top source of income.

In 2017, the band released their fifth studio album and their first in six years, Derelicts. They made the conscious decision to take elements from their first three albums that they enjoyed the most and develop new tracks from those ideas. It marked a development in their sound, as by now, they were almost exclusively working with hardware-based instruments and setups which gave the record a lo-fi quality. The album marked the band's first official music video release, for the track "Accede". In 2021, Carbon Based Lifeforms released their sixth studio album, Stochastic. It originated when the group started to test random functions on some old synthesisers, which produced musical ideas suited for "passive listening whilst not stealing focus."

Other projects
In March 2022, Vadestrid announced that he had completed the first draft of a book about the history of the band. Its working title is The Path to Derelicts.

Discography
Studio albums
 The Path (1998, as their previous incarnation Notch)
 Hydroponic Garden (2003)
 World of Sleepers (2006)
 Interloper (2010)
 Twentythree (2011)
 Derelicts (2017)
 Stochastic (2021)

Compilations
 Alt:01 (2016; collection of previously unreleased live tracks and remixes)
 Alt:02 (2020)

Soundtracks
 Refuge (film, 2013)
 SteamWorld Heist (video game, 2015)
 Spartaga (video game, 2017)

EPs
 Irdial (2008)
 VLA (2011)
 Mos 6581 Remixes (2016)
 Photosynthesis Remixes (2016)
 20 Minutes (2021)

DJ mixes
Regrouped compilations of other artists made by CBL.

 Isolatedmix 23 (2011)

Appearances

References

External links 
 Official website
 Carbon Based Lifeforms at last.fm

Ambient music groups
Electronic music duos
Musical groups from Gothenburg
Musical groups established in 1996
Chill-out musicians
Downtempo musicians